History (derived ) is the systematic study and documentation of human activity. The time period of events before the invention of writing systems is considered prehistory. "History" is an umbrella term comprising past events as well as the memory, discovery, collection, organization, presentation, and interpretation of these events. Historians seek knowledge of the past using historical sources such as written documents, oral accounts, art and material artifacts, and ecological markers. History is not complete and still has debatable mysteries.

History is also an academic discipline which uses narrative to describe, examine, question, and analyze past events, and investigate their patterns of cause and effect. Historians often debate which narrative best explains an event, as well as the significance of different causes and effects. Historians also debate the nature of history as an end in itself, as well as its usefulness to give perspective on the problems of the present.

Stories common to a particular culture, but not supported by external sources (such as the tales surrounding King Arthur), are usually classified as cultural heritage or legends. History differs from myth in that it is supported by verifiable evidence. However, ancient cultural influences have helped spawn variant interpretations of the nature of history which have evolved over the centuries and continue to change today. The modern study of history is wide-ranging, and includes the study of specific regions and the study of certain topical or thematic elements of historical investigation. History is often taught as a part of primary and secondary education, and the academic study of history is a major discipline in university studies.

Herodotus, a 5th-century BC Greek historian, is often considered the "father of history" (as he was one of the first historians) in the Western tradition, although he has also been criticized as the "father of lies". Along with his contemporary Thucydides, he helped form the foundations for the modern study of past events and societies. Their works continue to be read today, and the gap between the culture-focused Herodotus and the military-focused Thucydides remains a point of contention or approach in modern historical writing. In East Asia, a state chronicle, the Spring and Autumn Annals, was reputed to date from as early as 722 BC, although only 2nd-century BC texts have survived.

Etymology

The word history comes from historía. It was in that sense that Aristotle used the word in his History of Animals. The ancestor word  is attested early on in Homeric Hymns, Heraclitus, the Athenian ephebes' oath, and in Boeotic inscriptions (in a legal sense, either "judge" or "witness", or similar). The Greek word was borrowed into Classical Latin as historia, meaning "investigation, inquiry, research, account, description, written account of past events, writing of history, historical narrative, recorded knowledge of past events, story, narrative". History was borrowed from Latin (possibly via Old Irish or Old Welsh) into Old English as stær ("history, narrative, story"), but this word fell out of use in the late Old English period. Meanwhile, as Latin became Old French (and Anglo-Norman), historia developed into forms such as istorie, estoire, and historie, with new developments in the meaning: "account of the events of a person's life (beginning of the 12th century), chronicle, account of events as relevant to a group of people or people in general (1155), dramatic or pictorial representation of historical events, body of knowledge relative to human evolution, science, narrative of real or imaginary events, story".

It was from Anglo-Norman that history was borrowed into Middle English, and this time the loan stuck. It appears in the 13th-century Ancrene Wisse, but seems to have become a common word in the late 14th century, with an early attestation appearing in John Gower's Confessio Amantis of the 1390s (VI.1383): "I finde in a bok compiled | To this matiere an old histoire, | The which comth nou to mi memoire". In Middle English, the meaning of history was "story" in general. The restriction to the meaning "the branch of knowledge that deals with past events; the formal record or study of past events, esp. human affairs" arose in the mid-15th century. With the Renaissance, older senses of the word were revived, and it was in the Greek sense that Francis Bacon used the term in the late 16th century, when he wrote about natural history. For him, historia was "the knowledge of objects determined by space and time", that sort of knowledge provided by memory (while science was provided by reason, and poetry was provided by fantasy).

In an expression of the linguistic synthetic vs. analytic/isolating dichotomy, English like Chinese (史 vs. 诌) now designates separate words for human history and storytelling in general. In modern German, French, and most Germanic and Romance languages, which are solidly synthetic and highly inflected, the same word is still used to mean both "history" and "story". Historian in the sense of a "researcher of history" is attested from 1531. In all European languages, the substantive history is still used to mean both "what happened with men", and "the scholarly study of the happened", the latter sense sometimes distinguished with a capital letter, or the word historiography. The adjective historical is attested from 1661, and historic from 1669.

Description

Historians write in the context of their own time, and with due regard to the current dominant ideas of how to interpret the past, and sometimes write to provide lessons for their own society. In the words of Benedetto Croce, "All history is contemporary history". History is facilitated by the formation of a "true discourse of past" through the production of narrative and analysis of past events relating to the human race. The modern discipline of history is dedicated to the institutional production of this discourse.

All events that are remembered and preserved in some authentic form constitute the historical record. The task of historical discourse is to identify the sources which can most usefully contribute to the production of accurate accounts of past. Therefore, the constitution of the historian's archive is a result of circumscribing a more general archive by invalidating the usage of certain texts and documents (by falsifying their claims to represent the "true past"). Part of the historian's role is to skillfully and objectively use the vast amount of sources from the past, most often found in the archives. The process of creating a narrative inevitably generates a silence as historians remember or emphasize different events of the past.

The study of history has sometimes been classified as part of the humanities and at other times as part of the social sciences. It can also be seen as a bridge between those two broad areas, incorporating methodologies from both. Some individual historians strongly support one or the other classification. In the 20th century the Annales school revolutionized the study of history, by using such outside disciplines as economics, sociology, and geography in the study of global history.

Traditionally, historians have recorded events of the past, either in writing or by passing on an oral tradition, and have attempted to answer historical questions through the study of written documents and oral accounts. From the beginning, historians have also used such sources as monuments, inscriptions, and pictures. In general, the sources of historical knowledge can be separated into three categories: what is written, what is said, and what is physically preserved, and historians often consult all three. But writing is the marker that separates history from what comes before.

Archeology is especially helpful in unearthing buried sites and objects, which contribute to the study of history. Archeological finds rarely stand alone, with narrative sources complementing its discoveries. Archeology's methodologies and approaches are independent from the field of history. "Historical archaeology" is a specific branch of archeology which often contrasts its conclusions against those of contemporary textual sources. For example, Mark Leone, the excavator and interpreter of historical Annapolis, Maryland, US, has sought to understand the contradiction between textual documents idealizing "liberty" and the material record, demonstrating the possession of slaves and the inequalities of wealth made apparent by the study of the total historical environment.

There are varieties of ways in which history can be organized, including chronologically, culturally, territorially, and thematically. These divisions are not mutually exclusive, and significant intersections are often present. It is possible for historians to concern themselves with both the very specific and the very general, although the modern trend has been toward specialization. The area called Big History resists this specialization, and searches for universal patterns or trends. History has often been studied with some practical or theoretical aim, but also may be studied out of simple intellectual curiosity.

Prehistory

Human history is the memory of the past experience of Homo sapiens sapiens around the world, as that experience has been preserved, largely in written records. By "prehistory", historians mean the recovery of knowledge of the past in an area where no written records exist, or where the writing of a culture is not understood. By studying painting, drawings, carvings, and other artifacts, some information can be recovered even in the absence of a written record. Since the 20th century, the study of prehistory is considered essential to avoid history's implicit exclusion of certain civilizations, such as those of Sub-Saharan Africa and pre-Columbian America. Historians in the West have been criticized for focusing disproportionately on the Western world. In 1961, British historian E. H. Carr wrote:

This definition includes within the scope of history the strong interests of peoples, such as Indigenous Australians and New Zealand Māori in the past, and the oral records maintained and transmitted to succeeding generations, even before their contact with European civilization.

Historiography

Historiography has a number of related meanings. Firstly, it can refer to how history has been produced: the story of the development of methodology and practices (for example, the move from short-term biographical narrative toward long-term thematic analysis). Secondly, it can refer to what has been produced: a specific body of historical writing (for example, "medieval historiography during the 1960s" means "Works of medieval history written during the 1960s"). Thirdly, it may refer to why history is produced: the philosophy of history. As a meta-level analysis of descriptions of the past, this third conception can relate to the first two in that the analysis usually focuses on the narratives, interpretations, world view, use of evidence, or method of presentation of other historians. Professional historians also debate the question of whether history can be taught as a single coherent narrative or a series of competing narratives.

Methods

The historical method comprises the techniques and guidelines by which historians use primary sources and other evidence to research and then to write history.

Herodotus of Halicarnassus (484 BC–) has generally been acclaimed as the "father of history". However, his contemporary Thucydides (–) is credited with having first approached history with a well-developed historical method in his work the History of the Peloponnesian War. Thucydides, unlike Herodotus, regarded history as being the product of the choices and actions of human beings, and looked at cause and effect, rather than as the result of divine intervention (though Herodotus was not wholly committed to this idea himself). In his historical method, Thucydides emphasized chronology, a nominally neutral point of view, and that the human world was the result of the actions of human beings. Greek historians also viewed history as cyclical, with events regularly recurring.

There were historical traditions and sophisticated use of historical method in ancient and medieval China. The groundwork for professional historiography in East Asia was established by the Han dynasty court historian known as Sima Qian (145–90 BC), author of the Records of the Grand Historian (Shiji). For the quality of his written work, Sima Qian is posthumously known as the Father of Chinese historiography. Chinese historians of subsequent dynastic periods in China used his Shiji as the official format for historical texts, as well as for biographical literature.

Saint Augustine was influential in Christian and Western thought at the beginning of the medieval period. Through the Medieval and Renaissance periods, history was often studied through a sacred or religious perspective. Around 1800, German philosopher and historian Georg Wilhelm Friedrich Hegel brought philosophy and a more secular approach in historical study.

In the preface to his book, the Muqaddimah (1377), the Arab historian and early sociologist, Ibn Khaldun, warned of seven mistakes that he thought that historians regularly committed. In this criticism, he approached the past as strange and in need of interpretation. The originality of Ibn Khaldun was to claim that the cultural difference of another age must govern the evaluation of relevant historical material, to distinguish the principles according to which it might be possible to attempt the evaluation, and lastly, to feel the need for experience, in addition to rational principles, in order to assess a culture of the past. Ibn Khaldun often criticized "idle superstition and uncritical acceptance of historical data". As a result, he introduced a scientific method to the study of history, and he often referred to it as his "new science". His historical method also laid the groundwork for the observation of the role of state, communication, propaganda and systematic bias in history, and he is thus considered to be the "father of historiography"
 or the "father of the philosophy of history".

In the West, historians developed modern methods of historiography in the 17th and 18th centuries, especially in France and Germany. In 1851, Herbert Spencer summarized these methods:

By the "rich ore" Spencer meant scientific theory of history. Meanwhile, Henry Thomas Buckle expressed a dream of history becoming one day science:

Contrary to Buckle's dream, the 19th-century historian with greatest influence on methods became Leopold von Ranke in Germany. He limited history to "what really happened" and by this directed the field further away from science. For Ranke, historical data should be collected carefully, examined objectively and put together with critical rigor. But these procedures "are merely the prerequisites and preliminaries of science. The heart of science is searching out order and regularity in the data being examined and in formulating generalizations or laws about them."

In the 20th century, academic historians focused less on epic nationalistic narratives, which often tended to glorify the nation or great men, to more objective and complex analyses of social and intellectual forces. A major trend of historical methodology in the 20th century was a tendency to treat history more as a social science rather than as an art, which traditionally had been the case. Some of the leading advocates of history as a social science were a diverse collection of scholars which included Fernand Braudel, E. H. Carr, Fritz Fischer, Emmanuel Le Roy Ladurie, Hans-Ulrich Wehler, Bruce Trigger, Marc Bloch, Karl Dietrich Bracher, Peter Gay, Robert Fogel, Lucien Febvre, and Lawrence Stone. Many of the advocates of history as a social science were or are noted for their multidisciplinary approach. Braudel combined history with geography, Bracher history with political science, Fogel history with economics, Gay history with psychology, Trigger history with archeology, while Wehler, Bloch, Fischer, Stone, Febvre, and Le Roy Ladurie have in varying and differing ways amalgamated history with sociology, geography, anthropology, and economics. Nevertheless, these multidisciplinary approaches failed to produce a theory of history. So far only one theory of history came from the pen of a professional Historian. Whatever other theories of history we have, they were written by experts from other fields (for example, Marxian theory of history). More recently, the field of digital history has begun to address ways of using computer technology to pose new questions to historical data and generate digital scholarship.

In sincere opposition to the claims of history as a social science, historians such as Hugh Trevor-Roper, John Lukacs, Donald Creighton, Gertrude Himmelfarb, and Gerhard Ritter argued that the key to the historians' work was the power of the imagination, and hence contended that history should be understood as an art. French historians associated with the Annales School introduced quantitative history, using raw data to track the lives of typical individuals, and were prominent in the establishment of cultural history (cf. histoire des mentalités). Intellectual historians such as Herbert Butterfield, Ernst Nolte and George Mosse have argued for the significance of ideas in history. American historians, motivated by the civil rights era, focused on formerly overlooked ethnic, racial, and socioeconomic groups. Another genre of social history to emerge in the post-WWII era was Alltagsgeschichte (History of Everyday Life). Scholars such as Martin Broszat, Ian Kershaw and Detlev Peukert sought to examine what everyday life was like for ordinary people in 20th-century Germany, especially in the Nazi period.

Marxist historians such as Eric Hobsbawm, E. P. Thompson, Rodney Hilton, Georges Lefebvre, Eugene Genovese, Isaac Deutscher, C. L. R. James, Timothy Mason, Herbert Aptheker, Arno J. Mayer, and Christopher Hill have sought to validate Karl Marx's theories by analyzing history from a Marxist perspective. In response to the Marxist interpretation of history, historians such as François Furet, Richard Pipes, J. C. D. Clark, Roland Mousnier, Henry Ashby Turner, and Robert Conquest have offered anti-Marxist interpretations of history. Feminist historians such as Joan Wallach Scott, Claudia Koonz, Natalie Zemon Davis, Sheila Rowbotham, Gisela Bock, Gerda Lerner, Elizabeth Fox-Genovese, and Lynn Hunt have argued for the importance of studying the experience of women in the past. In recent years, postmodernists have challenged the validity and need for the study of history on the basis that all history is based on the personal interpretation of sources. In his 1997 book In Defence of History, Richard J. Evans defended the worth of history. Another defense of history from postmodernist criticism was the Australian historian Keith Windschuttle's 1994 book, The Killing of History.

Today, most historians begin their research process in the archives, on either a physical or digital platform. They often propose an argument and use their research to support it. John H. Arnold proposed that history is an argument, which creates the possibility of creating change. Digital information companies, such as Google, have sparked controversy over the role of internet censorship in information access.

Marxian theory

The Marxist theory of historical materialism theorises that society is fundamentally determined by the material conditions at any given time – in other words, the relationships which people have with each other in order to fulfill basic needs such as feeding, clothing and housing themselves and their families. Overall, Marx and Engels claimed to have identified five successive stages of the development of these material conditions in Western Europe. Marxist historiography was once orthodoxy in the Soviet Union, but since the collapse of communism there in 1991, Mikhail Krom says it has been reduced to the margins of scholarship.

Potential shortcomings in the production of history 
Many historians believe that the production of history is embedded with bias because events and known facts in history can be interpreted in a variety of ways. Constantin Fasolt suggested that history is linked to politics by the practice of silence itself. He also said: "A second common view of the link between history and politics rests on the elementary observation that historians are often influenced by politics." According to Michel-Rolph Trouillot, the historical process is rooted in the archives, therefore silences, or parts of history that are forgotten, may be an intentional part of a narrative strategy that dictates how areas of history are remembered. Historical omissions can occur in many ways and can have a profound effect on historical records. Information can also purposely be excluded or left out accidentally. Historians have coined multiple terms that describe the act of omitting historical information, including: "silencing", "selective memory", and erasures. Gerda Lerner, a twentieth century historian who focused much of her work on historical omissions involving women and their accomplishments, explained the negative impact that these omissions had on minority groups.

Environmental historian William Cronon proposed three ways to combat bias and ensure authentic and accurate narratives: narratives must not contradict known fact, they must make ecological sense (specifically for environmental history), and published work must be reviewed by scholarly community and other historians to ensure accountability.

Areas of study

Periods

Historical study often focuses on events and developments that occur in particular blocks of time. Historians give these periods of time names in order to allow "organising ideas and classificatory generalisations" to be used by historians. The names given to a period can vary with geographical location, as can the dates of the beginning and end of a particular period. Centuries and decades are commonly used periods and the time they represent depends on the dating system used. Most periods are constructed retrospectively and so reflect value judgments made about the past. The way periods are constructed and the names given to them can affect the way they are viewed and studied.

Prehistoric periodization
The field of history generally leaves prehistory to archeologists, who have entirely different sets of tools and theories. In archeology, the usual method for periodization of the distant prehistoric past is to rely on changes in material culture and technology, such as the Stone Age, Bronze Age, and Iron Age, with subdivisions that are also based on different styles of material remains. Here prehistory is divided into a series of "chapters" so that periods in history could unfold not only in a relative chronology but also narrative chronology. This narrative content could be in the form of functional-economic interpretation. There are periodizations, however, that do not have this narrative aspect, relying largely on relative chronology, and that are thus devoid of any specific meaning.

Despite the development over recent decades of the ability through radiocarbon dating and other scientific methods to give actual dates for many sites or artefacts, these long-established schemes seem likely to remain in use. In many cases neighboring cultures with writing have left some history of cultures without it, which may be used. Periodization, however, is not viewed as a perfect framework, with one account explaining that "cultural changes do not conveniently start and stop (combinedly) at periodization boundaries" and that different trajectories of change need to be studied in their own right before they get intertwined with cultural phenomena.

Geographical locations
Particular geographical locations can form the basis of historical study, for example, continents, countries, and cities. Understanding why historic events took place is important. To do this, historians often turn to geography. According to Jules Michelet in his book Histoire de France (1833), "without geographical basis, the people, the makers of history, seem to be walking on air". Weather patterns, the water supply, and the landscape of a place all affect the lives of the people who live there. For example, to explain why the ancient Egyptians developed a successful civilization, studying the geography of Egypt is essential. Egyptian civilization was built on the banks of the Nile River, which flooded each year, depositing soil on its banks. The rich soil could help farmers grow enough crops to feed the people in the cities. That meant everyone did not have to farm, so some people could perform other jobs that helped develop the civilization. There is also the case of climate, which historians like Ellsworth Huntington and Ellen Churchill Semple cited as a crucial influence on the course of history. Huntington and Semple further argued that climate has an impact on racial temperament.

Regions
 History of Africa begins with the first emergence of modern human beings on the continent, continuing into its modern present as a patchwork of diverse and politically developing nation states.
 History of the Americas is the collective history of North and South America, including Central America and the Caribbean.
 History of North America is the study of the past passed down from generation to generation on the continent in the Earth's northern and western hemisphere.
 History of Central America is the study of the past passed down from generation to generation on the continent in the Earth's western hemisphere.
 History of the Caribbean begins with the oldest evidence where 7,000-year-old remains have been found.
 History of South America is the study of the past passed down from generation to generation on the continent in the Earth's southern and western hemisphere.

 History of Antarctica emerges from early Western theories of a vast continent, known as Terra Australis, believed to exist in the far south of the globe.
 History of Eurasia is the collective history of several distinct peripheral coastal regions: the Middle East, South Asia, East Asia, Southeast Asia, and Europe, linked by the interior mass of the Eurasian steppe of Central Asia and Eastern Europe.
 History of Europe describes the passage of time from humans inhabiting the European continent to the present day.
 History of Asia can be seen as the collective history of several distinct peripheral coastal regions, East Asia, South Asia, and the Middle East linked by the interior mass of the Eurasian steppe.
 History of East Asia is the study of the past passed down from generation to generation in East Asia.
 History of the Middle East begins with the earliest civilizations in the region now known as the Middle East that were established around 3000 BC, in Mesopotamia (Iraq).
 History of India is the study of the past passed down from generation to generation in the sub-Himalayan region.
 History of Southeast Asia has been characterized as interaction between regional players and foreign powers.
 History of Oceania is the collective history of Australia, New Zealand and the Pacific Islands.
 History of Australia starts with the documentation of the Makassar trading with Indigenous Australians on Australia's north coast.
 History of New Zealand dates back at least 700 years to when it was discovered and settled by Polynesians, who developed a distinct Māori culture centered on kinship links and land.
 History of the Pacific Islands covers the history of the islands in the Pacific Ocean.

Military

Military history concerns warfare, strategies, battles, weapons, and the psychology of combat. The "new military history" since the 1970s has been concerned with soldiers more than generals, with psychology more than tactics, and with the broader impact of warfare on society and culture.

Religious

The history of religion has been a main theme for both secular and religious historians for centuries, and continues to be taught in seminaries and academe. Leading journals include Church History, The Catholic Historical Review, and History of Religions. Topics range widely from political and cultural and artistic dimensions, to theology and liturgy. This subject studies religions from all regions and areas of the world where humans have lived.

Social

Social history, sometimes called the new social history, is the field that includes history of ordinary people and their strategies and institutions for coping with life. In its "golden age" it was a major growth field in the 1960s and 1970s among scholars, and still is well represented in history departments. In two decades from 1975 to 1995, the proportion of professors of history in American universities identifying with social history rose from 31% to 41%, while the proportion of political historians fell from 40% to 30%. In the history departments of British universities in 2007, of the 5723 faculty members, 1644 (29%) identified themselves with social history while political history came next with 1425 (25%). The "old" social history before the 1960s was a hodgepodge of topics without a central theme, and it often included political movements, like Populism, that were "social" in the sense of being outside the elite system. Social history was contrasted with political history, intellectual history and the history of great men. English historian G. M. Trevelyan saw it as the bridging point between economic and political history, reflecting that, "Without social history, economic history is barren and political history unintelligible." While the field has often been viewed negatively as history with the politics left out, it has also been defended as "history with the people put back in".

Subfields
The chief subfields of social history include:
 Black history
 Demographic history
 Ethnic history
 Gender history
 History of childhood
 History of education
 History of the family
 Labor history
 LGBT history
 Rural history
 Urban history
 American urban history
 Women's history

Cultural

Cultural history replaced social history as the dominant form in the 1980s and 1990s. It typically combines the approaches of anthropology and history to look at language, popular cultural traditions and cultural interpretations of historical experience. It examines the records and narrative descriptions of past knowledge, customs, and arts of a group of people. How peoples constructed their memory of the past is a major topic. Cultural history includes the study of art in society as well is the study of images and human visual production (iconography).

Diplomatic

Diplomatic history focuses on the relationships between nations, primarily regarding diplomacy and the causes of wars. More recently it looks at the causes of peace and human rights. It typically presents the viewpoints of the foreign office, and long-term strategic values, as the driving force of continuity and change in history. This type of political history is the study of the conduct of international relations between states or across state boundaries over time. Historian Muriel Chamberlain notes that after the First World War, "diplomatic history replaced constitutional history as the flagship of historical investigation, at once the most important, most exact and most sophisticated of historical studies". She adds that after 1945, the trend reversed, allowing social history to replace it.

Economic

Although economic history has been well established since the late 19th century, in recent years academic studies have shifted more and more toward economics departments and away from traditional history departments. Business history deals with the history of individual business organizations, business methods, government regulation, labour relations, and impact on society. It also includes biographies of individual companies, executives, and entrepreneurs. It is related to economic history. Business history is most often taught in business schools.

Environmental

Environmental history is a new field that emerged in the 1980s to look at the history of the environment, especially in the long run, and the impact of human activities upon it. It is an offshoot of the environmental movement, which was kickstarted by Rachel Carson's Silent Spring in the 1960s.

World

World history is the study of major civilizations over the last 3000 years or so. World history is primarily a teaching field, rather than a research field. It gained popularity in the United States, Japan and other countries after the 1980s with the realization that students need a broader exposure to the world as globalization proceeds.

It has led to highly controversial interpretations by Oswald Spengler and Arnold J. Toynbee, among others.

The World History Association publishes the Journal of World History every quarter since 1990. The H-World discussion list serves as a network of communication among practitioners of world history, with discussions among scholars, announcements, syllabi, bibliographies and book reviews.

People's

A people's history is a type of historical work which attempts to account for historical events from the perspective of common people. A people's history is the history of the world that is the story of mass movements and of the outsiders. Individuals or groups not included in the past in other types of writing about history are the primary focus, which includes the disenfranchised, the oppressed, the poor, the nonconformists, and the otherwise forgotten people. The authors are typically on the left and have a socialist model in mind, as in the approach of the History Workshop movement in Britain in the 1960s.

Intellectual

Intellectual history and the history of ideas emerged in the mid-20th century, with the focus on the intellectuals and their books on the one hand, and on the other the study of ideas as disembodied objects with a career of their own.

Gender

Gender history is a subfield of History and Gender studies, which looks at the past from the perspective of gender. The outgrowth of gender history from women's history stemmed from many non-feminist historians dismissing the importance of women in history. According to Joan W. Scott, "Gender is a constitutive element of social relationships based on perceived differences between the sexes, and gender is a primary way of signifying relations of power", meaning that gender historians study the social effects of perceived differences between the sexes and how all genders use allotted power in societal and political structures. Despite being a relatively new field, gender history has had a significant effect on the general study of history. Gender history traditionally differs from women's history in its inclusion of all aspects of gender such as masculinity and femininity, and today's gender history extends to include people who identify outside of that binary.
LGBT history deals with the first recorded instances of same-sex love and sexuality of ancient civilizations, and involves the history of lesbian, gay, bisexual and transgender (LGBT) peoples and cultures around the world.

Public

Public history describes the broad range of activities undertaken by people with some training in the discipline of history who are generally working outside of specialized academic settings. Public history practice has quite deep roots in the areas of historic preservation, archival science, oral history, museum curatorship, and other related fields. The term itself began to be used in the U.S. and Canada in the late 1970s, and the field has become increasingly professionalized since that time. Some of the most common settings for public history are museums, historic homes and historic sites, parks, battlefields, archives, film and television companies, and all levels of government.

Historians

Professional and amateur historians discover, collect, organize, and present information about past events. They discover this information through archeological evidence, written primary sources, verbal stories or oral histories, and other archival material. In lists of historians, historians can be grouped by order of the historical period in which they were writing, which is not necessarily the same as the period in which they specialized. Chroniclers and annalists, though they are not historians in the true sense, are also frequently included.

Judgement

Since the 20th century, Western historians have disavowed the aspiration to provide the "judgement of history". The goals of historical judgements or interpretations are separate to those of legal judgements, that need to be formulated quickly after the events and be final. A related issue to that of the judgement of history is that of collective memory.

Pseudohistory

Pseudohistory is a term applied to texts which purport to be historical in nature but which depart from standard historiographical conventions in a way which undermines their conclusions. It is closely related to deceptive historical revisionism. Works which draw controversial conclusions from new, speculative, or disputed historical evidence, particularly in the fields of national, political, military, and religious affairs, are often rejected as pseudohistory.

Teaching

Scholarship vs teaching
A major intellectual battle took place in Britain in the early twentieth century regarding the place of history teaching in the universities. At Oxford and Cambridge, scholarship was downplayed. Professor Charles Harding Firth, Oxford's Regius Professor of history in 1904 ridiculed the system as best suited to produce superficial journalists. The Oxford tutors, who had more votes than the professors, fought back in defense of their system saying that it successfully produced Britain's outstanding statesmen, administrators, prelates, and diplomats, and that mission was as valuable as training scholars. The tutors dominated the debate until after the Second World War. It forced aspiring young scholars to teach at outlying schools, such as Manchester University, where Thomas Frederick Tout was professionalizing the History undergraduate programme by introducing the study of original sources and requiring the writing of a thesis.

In the United States, scholarship was concentrated at the major PhD-producing universities, while the large number of other colleges and universities focused on undergraduate teaching. A tendency in the 21st century was for the latter schools to increasingly demand scholarly productivity of their younger tenure-track faculty. Furthermore, universities have increasingly relied on inexpensive part-time adjuncts to do most of the classroom teaching.

Nationalism
From the origins of national school systems in the 19th century, the teaching of history to promote national sentiment has been a high priority. In the United States after World War I, a strong movement emerged at the university level to teach courses in Western Civilization, so as to give students a common heritage with Europe. In the U.S. after 1980, attention increasingly moved toward teaching world history or requiring students to take courses in non-western cultures, to prepare students for life in a globalized economy.

At the university level, historians debate the question of whether history belongs more to social science or to the humanities. Many view the field from both perspectives.

The teaching of history in French schools was influenced by the Nouvelle histoire as disseminated after the 1960s by Cahiers pédagogiques and Enseignement and other journals for teachers. Also influential was the Institut national de recherche et de documentation pédagogique, (INRDP). Joseph Leif, the Inspector-general of teacher training, said pupils children should learn about historians' approaches as well as facts and dates. Louis François, Dean of the History/Geography group in the Inspectorate of National Education advised that teachers should provide historic documents and promote "active methods" which would give pupils "the immense happiness of discovery". Proponents said it was a reaction against the memorization of names and dates that characterized teaching and left the students bored. Traditionalists protested loudly it was a postmodern innovation that threatened to leave the youth ignorant of French patriotism and national identity.

Bias in school teaching

In several countries history textbooks are tools to foster nationalism and patriotism, and give students the official narrative about national enemies.

In many countries, history textbooks are sponsored by the national government and are written to put the national heritage in the most favorable light. For example, in Japan, mention of the Nanking Massacre has been removed from textbooks and the entire Second World War is given cursory treatment. Other countries have complained. Another example includes Turkey, where there is no mention of the Armenian Genocide in Turkish textbooks as a result of the denial of the genocide.

It was standard policy in communist countries to present only a rigid Marxist historiography.

In the United States, textbooks published by the same company often differ in content from state to state. An example of content that is represented different in different regions of the country is the history of the Southern states, where slavery and the American Civil War are treated as controversial topics. McGraw-Hill Education for example, was criticized for describing Africans brought to American plantations as "workers" instead of slaves in a textbook.

Academic historians have often fought against the politicization of the textbooks, sometimes with success.

In 21st-century Germany, the history curriculum is controlled by the 16 states, and is characterized not by superpatriotism but rather by an "almost pacifistic and deliberately unpatriotic undertone" and reflects "principles formulated by international organizations such as UNESCO or the Council of Europe, thus oriented towards human rights, democracy and peace." The result is that "German textbooks usually downplay national pride and ambitions and aim to develop an understanding of citizenship centered on democracy, progress, human rights, peace, tolerance and Europeanness."

See also
 Outline of history
 Glossary of history

References

Further reading

  Annotated guide to 27,000 of the most important English language history books in all fields and topics.
 
 
  Discussion of the impact of the end of the Cold War upon scholarly research funding, the impact of the Internet and Wikipedia on history study and teaching, and the importance of storytelling in history writing and teaching.
 
 
   excerpt and text search.
 
   excerpt and text search.
 
  excerpt and text search.
  This is Book 1 of 25 Volumes.

External links

  of BestHistorySites
  of BBC History
 Internet History Sourcebooks Project See also Internet History Sourcebooks Project (Collections of public domain and copy-permitted historical texts for educational use)

 
Humanities
Main topic articles